William Barton Rogers Hobbs (July 30, 1949 – January 4, 2020) was an American rower who competed in the 1968 and 1972 Summer Olympics. He was born in Ponce, Puerto Rico and is the younger brother of Franklin Hobbs.  In 1968 he stroked the American coxed pair which finished fifth in the Rowing at the 1968 Summer Olympics in Mexico. In 1970 he competed on the Dating Game for a date with Karen Carpenter. Two years later he rowed #3 in the American eight that won a silver medal in the 1972 Munich Olympics. He graduated from Harvard College and Harvard Business School.

References

External links

Bill Hobbs' obituary

1949 births
2020 deaths
Rowers at the 1968 Summer Olympics
Rowers at the 1972 Summer Olympics
Olympic silver medalists for the United States in rowing
American male rowers
Medalists at the 1972 Summer Olympics
Harvard Crimson rowers
Harvard Business School alumni
Harvard College alumni